Mare Moscoviense is a lunar mare that sits in the Moscoviense basin. It is one of the very few maria on the far side of the Moon. Like Mare Marginis, this mare appears to be fairly thin. However, it is clearly centered within a large impact basin. It is also much lower than either the outer basin floor or the farside highlands.

The great depth of this mare beneath the nearby highlands probably explains why mare units are so rare on the lunar farside. Very few basins on the farside were deep enough to allow mare volcanism. Thus, while large impact basins are found on both the nearside and farside, large maria are mostly found on the nearside. Mare lavas apparently could reach the surface more often and more easily there. The basin material is of the Nectarian epoch, while the mare material is of the Upper Imbrian epoch. Following the SELENE mission, scientists proposed that volcanism in Mare Moscoviense was active for at least ~1.5 Ga following the formation of the Moscoviense basin, but the formation of the mare as the result of a meteorite cluster impact, rather than from volcanism, has also been proposed based on the energy required to melt the lava in Mare Moscoviense.

At the center of the basin (or the southwest portion of the mare) is a mascon, or gravitational high.  The mascon was first identified by Doppler tracking of the Lunar Prospector spacecraft.

The crater Titov is in the northeastern region of the mare, and Tereshkova lies along the northern edge. The floor-fractured crater Komarov lies on the southeast edge of the mare.  The Korolev basin is to the southeast of the mare, and the Freundlich-Sharonov Basin is to the east.

According to NASA's website, the region was named —stated as meaning "Sea of Moscow"—after the first images of the far side were returned by Luna 3 in 1959. This may be a typo for Mare Moscoviae, which is the expected Latin for "sea of Moscow (or of Muscovy)". The name was approved by the IAU in 1961. The names of maria generally call up psychic states of mind, with a few exceptions. When Mare Moscoviense was discovered, and the name was proposed by the Soviet Union, it was only accepted by the International Astronomical Union with the justification that Moscow is a state of mind.

Gallery

See also
 Leonov (crater), named for cosmonaut Alexei Leonov,  lies just to the south of Mare Moscoviense

References

External links
 The mare is seen shortly after the 1:20 minute mark in this NASA video commemorating Apollo 13

Moscoviense
Moscoviense
Moscoviense